Minacragides is a genus of moths of the family Dalceridae.

Species
 Minacragides arnacis Dyar, 1909

Former species
 Minacragides argentata Hopp, 1922

References

Dalceridae
Zygaenoidea genera